Eutypomyidae is a family of extinct rodents from North America and Eurasia thought to be related to modern beavers.

References

Prehistoric rodent families
Eocene first appearances
Miocene extinctions